This is a list of sovereign states or polities that existed in the 4th century BC.

Sovereign states

See also
List of Bronze Age states
List of Iron Age states
List of Classical Age states
List of states during Late Antiquity
List of states during the Middle Ages

References

-04
4th century BC-related lists